Porphyra is a genus of coldwater seaweeds that grow in cold, shallow seawater. More specifically, it belongs to red algae phylum of laver species (from which comes laverbread), comprising approximately 70 species. It grows in the intertidal zone, typically between the upper intertidal zone and the splash zone in cold waters of temperate oceans. In East Asia, it is used to produce the sea vegetable products nori (in Japan) and gim (in Korea). There are considered to be 60 to 70 species of Porphyra worldwide and seven around Britain and Ireland where it has been traditionally used to produce edible sea vegetables on the Irish Sea coast. The species Porphyra purpurea has one of the largest plastid genomes known, with 251 genes.

Life cycle
Porphyra displays a heteromorphic alternation of generations. The thallus we see is the haploid generation; it can reproduce asexually by forming spores which grow to replicate the original thallus. It can also reproduce sexually. Both male and female gametes are formed on the one thallus. The female gametes while still on the thallus are fertilized by the released male gametes, which are non-motile. The fertilized, now diploid, carposporangia after mitosis produce spores (carpospores) which settle, then bore into shells, germinate and form a filamentous stage.  This stage was originally thought to be a different species of alga, and was referred to as Conchocelis rosea. That Conchocelis was the diploid stage of Porphyra was discovered  in 1949 by the British phycologist Kathleen Mary Drew-Baker for the European species Porphyra umbilicalis. It was later shown for species from other regions as well.

Food
Most human cultures with access to  use it as a food or somehow in the diet, making it perhaps the most domesticated of the marine algae, known as laver,  (Vietnamese), nori (Japanese:), amanori (Japanese), zakai, gim (Korean:), zǐcài (Chinese:), karengo, sloke or slukos. The marine red alga Porphyra has been cultivated extensively in many Asian countries as an edible seaweed used to wrap the rice and fish that compose the Japanese food sushi and the Korean food gimbap. In Japan, the annual production of Porphyra species is valued at 100 billion yen (US$1 billion).

 is harvested from the coasts of Great Britain and Ireland, where it has a variety of culinary uses including  laverbread. In Hawaii, "the species  is considered a great delicacy, called ". Porphyra was also harvested by the Southern Kwakiutl, Haida, Seechelt, Squawmish, Nuu-chah-nulth, Nuxalk, Tsimshian, and Tlingit peoples of the North American Pacific coast.

Vitamin B12
Porphyra contains vitamin B12 and one study suggests that it is the most suitable non-meat source of this essential vitamin. In the view of the Academy of Nutrition and Dietetics, it may not provide an adequate source of it for vegans.

Species

Following a major reassessment of the  genus in 2011, many species previously included in Porphyra have been transferred to Pyropia, for example Pyropia tenera, Pyropia yezoensis and the species from New Zealand Pyropia rakiura and Pyropia virididentata, leaving only five species out of seventy still within Porphyra itself.

References

External links
 
 
 Video footage of Laverbread or Bara Lawr

Red algae genera
Bangiophyceae
Edible seaweeds
Seaweeds
Edible algae
Taxa named by Carl Adolph Agardh